Edward Michael Bennis (July 30, 1885 – ) was an American football player and coach of football and basketball.  He served as the head football coach at Villanova College—now known as Villanova University—in 1916, compiling a record of 1–8. Bennis was also the head coach for the Saint Joseph's Hawks men's basketball team for one season (1910–11) and finished with a 6–6 record. In addition to coaching the basketball team, he was also hired in 1909 to coach the St Joe's football team.  Bennis was a standout football player at the University of Pennsylvania. He graduated from Penn in 1906.

Head coaching record

Football

References

1885 births
Year of death uncertain
Georgetown Hoyas football coaches
Penn Quakers football players
Saint Joseph's Hawks football coaches
Saint Joseph's Hawks men's basketball coaches
Villanova Wildcats football coaches
Players of American football from Philadelphia